Rasmus Edström (born March 30, 1992) is a Swedish professional ice hockey player who is currently an unrestricted free agent. He most recently played with the Guildford Flames in the UK EIHL.

He played with Skellefteå AIK in the Elitserien during the 2010–11 Elitserien season and is currently playing with

References

External links

1992 births
Living people
IF Björklöven players
Guildford Flames players
Piteå HC players
Skellefteå AIK players
Swedish ice hockey defencemen
People from Skellefteå Municipality
Timrå IK players
VIK Västerås HK players
Sportspeople from Västerbotten County